Diphosphene is a type of organophosphorus compound that has a phosphorus–phosphorus double bond, denoted by R-P=P-R'. These compounds are not common but are of theoretical interest. Normally, compounds with the empirical formula RP exist as rings. However, like other multiple bonds between heavy main-group elements, P=P double bonds can be stabilized by a large steric hindrance from the substitutions. The first isolated diphosphene bis(2,4,6-tri-tert-butylphenyl)diphosphene was exemplified by Masaaki Yoshifuji and his coworkers in 1981, in which diphosphene is stabilized by two bulky phenyl group.

Synthesis

Synthesis of aryl-substituted diphosphene

In 1877, Köhler and Michaelis claimed that they synthesized the first isolated diphosphene (PhP=PPh). However, the molecular weight determination and X-ray crystallographic analysis later proved that this "diphosphene" only had a P-P single bond. Then the research to diphosphenes kept silent over almost 20 years until Masaaki Yoshifuji and his coworkers isolated an unprecedented diphosphene, bis(2,4,6-tri-tert-butylphenyl)diphosphene, in 1981. They first synthesized the (2,4,6-tri-tert-butylphenyl)phosphorus dichloride by adding phosphorus trichloride to (2,4,6-tri-butylphenyl)lithium that was the product of the lithium and halogen exchange. The phosphorus dichloride dimerized to a diphosphene after magnesium extracted two chlorine atoms from (2,4,6-tri-tert-butylphenyl)phosphorus dichloride. The P-P bond distance is 2.034 Å, which is much shorter than the average bond length in (C6H5P)5 (2.217 Å) and (C6H5P)6 (2.237 Å), indicating its double bond character. This research was a milestone in diphosphene studies because the product here was the first reported compound that had the isolated localized P=P bond. Moreover, this bulky structure provided a instructive pathway for the future synthesis of diphosphenes.

Synthesis of alkyl-substituted diphosphene
Tris(trimethylsilyl)methyl group is also a very bulky group that is often used to stabilize multiple bond between heavy elements.

Synthesis of boryl-substituted diphosphene

Boryl substituents reveal the potential as both π-electron acceptors and σ-electron donors. The vacant p orbitals enable it to accept the electrons, while low electronegativity reflects the σ donors properties. Computational studies predicted the existence of the boryl-substituted diphosphene and Makoto Yamashita et al. proved it experimentally in 2016. A borylzinc chloride was prepared by from a bulky boryl-lithium compound. This nucleophilic borylzinc compound could attack the phosphorus trichloride and formed boryl-substituted phosphorus dichloride. Similar to the synthesis procedure of a aryl-substituted diphosphene, the boryl-substituted diphosphene was obtained by mixing the boryl-substituted phosphorus dichloride with magnesium. Cyclic voltammogram and UV/Vis Spectrum illustrated that this boryl-substituted diphosphene has lower LUMO level and larger the HOMO-LUMO gap than the aryl-substituted diphosphene.

Synthesis of organic diphosphene without reduction
In 2019, Stephan and co-workers at the University of Toronto reported the first examples of di-vinyl-substituted diphosphenes via a ring opening/dimerization process from kinetically unstable 2H-phosphirenes.

Structures and bondings

Experimental data
X-ray analysis indicates certain important bond lengths and angles of the first diphosphene, bis(2,4,6-tri-tert-butylphenyl)diphosphene: P-P = 2.034 (2) Å; P-C = 1.826 (2) Å; P-P-C = 102.8 (1)o; C-P-P-C = 172.2 (1)o. Compared with the bond length of a P-P single bond in H2PPH2 (2.238 Å), the P-P bond distance is much shorter, which reveals double bond character. The orientation of the substituents about the P-P double bond in bis(2,4,6-tri-tert-butylphenyl)diphosphene exhibits an E (trans) configuration. But by visible irradiation of the trans isomer, an interconversion between cis isomer and trans isomers would occur. In 1984, M. Koening et al. noticed a different splitting mode and chemical shift in 1H NMR and 31P NMR under a direct irradiation of a toluene solution of E-bis(2,4,6-tri-tert-butylphenyl)diphosphene, which suggesting a cis-trans isomerization.

Spectroscopic properties
Diphosphene compounds usually exhibit a symmetry-allowed (intense) and symmetry-forbidden electronic transitions (weak). In Raman, there is significant enhancement of P=P stretch in the resonance with allowed electron  transition than with the forbidden  transition due to different geometries of excited states and enhancement mechanism.  Also the observed strong Raman shifts for and  suggest stronger dipnictenes feature of diphosphene compared with P-P single bond.

Excited triplet diphosphenes

Efforts to elucidate the excited states of diphosphenes is important and valuable to realize the application of PP double bonds in molecular electronics. In triplets trans-HPPH, the P-P bond length is predicted to be 2.291 Å. It is not only longer than the P-P double bond in ground state trans-bis(2,4,6-tri-tert-butylphenyl)diphosphene, but also longer than that of P-P single bond in H2PPH2.

Reactivity 
Selected reactivity of diphosphenes is summarized in the following picture, including oxidation, reduction, sulfurization, polymerization, carbene addition, halogenation, photolysis, and coordination to the transition-metal:

Carbene-involved reactions

Carbene addition

Similar to the ring-formation behavior in the carbene addition reaction of C=C double bonds, diphosphene can form a P-C-P three-membered ring with dihalocarbene :CCl2 or :CBr2. Diphosphiranes can further rearrange to 1,3-diphospha-allene via ring opening reactions by using MeLi or n-BuLi.

Carbene-mediated P=P double bond cleavage
Cleavage of C=C double bonds is very common and important in organic chemistry while that of unsaturated bonds between heavy Group 14 and Group 15 elements are lack of investigation. Successful polarization of Si-Si multiple bonds reveals potential interconversion between  -bonding electrons and lone-pair electrons in heavy Group 14 and Group 15 compounds that contain multiple bonds. Diphosphene, as the typical heavy-element multiple bonds in those compounds, can be cleaved by N-heterocyclic carbene (NHC), forming NHC-bound phosphinidenes.

Coordination to transition metals
Diphosphenes can bind to transition metal either in a η1 mode by donating a lone pair on phosphorus, or in a η2 behavior via a  interaction. If the bulky groups are aryl- groups, arene-coordinated products of η6-type coordination are also possible.

η1-type complexes
In 1983, Philip P. Power synthesized a transition-metal complex containing P=P double bond (trans–{[2}) via a simple one-step procedure. They mixed Na2[Fe(CO)4] and dichlorobis(trimethylsilyl)methylphosphine and got dark red-brown crystals, which was the first complex that contained an unbridged P-P double bond. Each phosphorus exhibited terminal coordination nature and the P-P distance was essentially unchanged. Later in 1983, A. H. Cowley reported ArP=PArFe(CO)5 (with Ar=2,4,6-tri-tert-butylphenyl) by treating diphosephene with Fe2(CO)9 or Na2Fe(CO)4. In this synthesis procedure, there was only one terminal P-coordination and P-P double bond had Z configuration. Apart from iron, other similar transition metal complexes by reacting diphosphenes with transition metal carbonyls of nickel, tungsten, and chromium were discovered and they all exhibited Z configuration. M. Yoshifuji proved E/Z isomerization can take place under lighting, probably via migration of the metal moiety from one side to the other.

η2-type complexes
Apart from the very bulky substituents, a η2-coordination of diphosphene to a metal is also possible to stabilize the P-P double bond. In 1982, K. R. Dixon et al. synthesized platinum and palladium complexes  (with M=Pt or Pd and L=(PPh3)2 or ), which contained side-on coordination. Different from η1 coordination complex, where P-P still kept the double bond nature, P-P distance in side-on coordination complexes (2.121Å in ) was significantly longer than that in non-coordinated bis(2,4,6-tri-tert-butylphenyl)diphosphene.

η6-type complexes
If there are aryl- groups on phosphorus, transition-metal can not only bind to the phosphorus directly, but also form arene-coordinated products of η6-type coordination. Refluxing diphosphene in 1,4-dioxane with the excess of Cr(CO)6 can generate mono and bis arene tricarbonylchromium(0) complexes.

Oxidation
Diphosphene is inert to ground-state oxygen but can be oxidized by triplet oxygen to give a mixture of phosphine oxides and hydroxy benzophosphole oxide. Compared to oxygen involved oxidation, reaction of diphosphene with ozone is much more rapid and indicates a 2:1 (ozone:diphosphene) stoichiometry. Ozonolysis of bis[tris(trimethylsilyl)methyl]diphosphene (Tsi2P2) gives a cyclic diperoxides.

Reduction 
Aluminum hydrides (AlH) such as lithium aluminum hydride can reduce diphosphene to give stable diphosphanes: ArP=PAr\ +\ AlH\rightarrow ArHP-PHAr (with Ar=2,4,6-tBu3C6H2)

See also
 Diazene
 Double bond rule

References

Organophosphorus compounds
Functional groups